The Military Aviation Museum in Virginia Beach, Virginia, is home to one of the world's largest collections of warbirds in flying condition. It includes examples from Germany, France, Italy, Russia, the United Kingdom, and the United States, from both World War I and World War II, and its complete collection ranges from the 1910s to the early 1950s.

Its mission is to "preserve, restore and fly these historic aircraft and to allow a new generation to experience and learn from what [their forebears] might have endured in the skies so very far from home."

The majority of the historic aircraft at the Museum have been restored to flying condition and they fly in twice-yearly major airshows (one in the spring for World War II aircraft, and one in the fall for World War I aircraft)

The collection also includes a large reference library, along with artifacts and materials to illustrate the historic context of the aircraft in the collection.

History

The Museum was founded by Gerald "Jerry" Yagen in 2005, and the museum's hangars were opened to the public in 2008. He had been collecting and restoring warbirds since the mid-1990s, starting with a Curtiss P-40E Kittyhawk,

Difficulties in 2013

In June 2013 it was reported that the museum and its collection of planes was to be sold off, due to some financial difficulties which Yagen's business was then experiencing. He was selling his vocational schools business, and no longer had the resources to finance the Museum.

An article in The Virginian-Pilot reported that Yagen had said "I'm subsidizing it heavily every year and my business no longer allows me to do that financially, and therefore I don't have a solution for it".

However, the announced sale of the museum and aircraft was premature; it was announced only a week later that "the museum won't close soon, some of the facility's planes ... may have to go to keep the operation aloft" and "'we are still open for business and business is normal'".

Several aircraft were sold, see below, but both Yagen's businesses and the museum are now operating normally. Since the sales in 2013, additional aircraft (including a projected replacement de Havilland Dragon Rapide) have been acquired and are under restoration to fly.

Facilities

The museum is housed at its own small private grass airfield, the Virginia Beach Airport, in the Pungo area of Virginia Beach, Virginia.

The complex includes two display hangars (one on each side of the main museum building) in one group of buildings, and in another group, a replica World War I-era wooden hangar, a maintenance hangar (entirely new, but an exact replica of a 1937 Works Progress Administration design), a restored authentic pre-WWII Luftwaffe metal hangar, and a set of three identical storage hangars painted to resemble British World War II hangars.

The Luftwaffe hangar was built in 1934 at Cottbus Air Base; after the base was closed during the reunification of Germany, the Museum obtained the hangar in 2004. It was dismantled and shipped to Virginia Beach and construction started in 2010 and finished in fall of 2012 at the Museum where it now houses the Museum's Luftwaffe aircraft.

Also underway is a control tower, a re-erection of a genuine ex-8th AAF World War II tower from RAF Goxhill. A two-story brick and concrete structure, it was completely disassembled, labeled and shipped to Virginia. It is currently being assembled at the Museum's airfield where it will be used as an operational tower. In the UK, some similar towers are now historically protected; when rebuilt, this will be the only such original control tower in the US.

The complex also includes a large orange and white checked water tower, which is visible from a considerable distance and provides a useful landmark for both ground and air travelers.

At the entrance to museum, there is also a large dinosaur park.

Restorations and Reproductions

Some of the aircraft obtained in an un-restored state are handled at the museum's related repair facility, the Fighter Factory (below); others are restored elsewhere, by contractors with specialized capabilities, including:
 Meier Motors 
 AV Specs Limited
 Pioneer Aero

The Museum is also connected to the Aviation Institute of Maintenance, which is currently building a small fleet of various World War I replicas, as an exercise for the students, to add to the Museum's collection. The current batch includes a Morane Saulnier AI, a Nieuport 11, a Nieuport 17, a Nieuport 24, a Sopwith Pup, a Sopwith Camel, a Sopwith 1½ Strutter, and a deHavilland D.H.2. Both the Morane Saulnier AI and the Sopwith 1½ Strutter have arrived at the museum.

The Fighter Factory

Associated with the museum is an aircraft restoration and maintenance organization, called The Fighter Factory, started in 1996 to restore the collection's first aircraft (the P-40E).

It was originally located at Norfolk Airport, and later moved to premises at the Suffolk Municipal Airport in Suffolk, Virginia. It currently operates two facilities: the one in Suffolk, and a new facility (in the purpose-built hangar) at the museum.

Airplane rides 
The museum offers guests the opportunity to fly in either the Waco YMF-5 or the Stearman N2S-3. Both of the aircraft are open cockpit biplanes.

See also

List of aerospace museums
Virginia Beach Airport

References

External links

Aerospace museums in Virginia
Military and war museums in Virginia
Museums in Virginia Beach, Virginia